is a vertically scrolling bullet hell arcade game released by Cave in 2012, and the sixth chapter in Cave's DonPachi series. A Japanese-region free release was released on May 30, 2013. An updated version, titled DoDonPachi SaiDaiOuJou EXA Label in Japan and DoDonPachi True Death EXA Label internationally, was released for the exA-Arcadia arcade platform in 2020, featuring a new "EXA Mode" difficulty.

Gameplay

Game scoring is similar to that of DaiOuJou. The biggest difference in scoring is that the chain hit counter does not reset immediately when the chain meter empties; the counter instead drops by 25% and decreases quickly until the chain continues. The chain meter can be kept above zero by using the laser.

Hyper mechanics have once again changed from the previous games. Hypers are obtained the same way you can obtain then in Daioujou, by collecting bee medals and racking up large combos. However, they have a max level of 10 and can be activated once the meter fills up, like in Dodonpachi Resurrection. In addition, Hypers can be built up much more quickly through obtaining point items called stars. This can be done through defeating enemies, or by cancelling bullets via destroying larger enemies. Hypers increase firepower of your shot and laser but do not cancel bullets like in Resurrection.

The arcade release has an "overflow glitch" that, when triggered, results in scores that are otherwise impossible. The "get point" counter beside the chain meter must exceed 21,474,836, at which point the score increases at an unintended fast rate. This glitch is removed in version 1.5.

Unlike past entries in the DoDonPachi series, the game has no second loop. The five stages each has eight bee medals to collect and a boss at the end. Following the defeat of stage 5 boss Taisabachi, the giant mechanical bee, a more difficult fight may follow if requirements are met. If every bee medal is collected in at least three stages and the player does not die more than once during the game, Hibachi will appear. If the player has collected all bee medals in the game, did not die once, and did not use a single bomb, an even more difficult boss will replace Hibachi: her evil alter ego, Inbachi.

Exa Label 
Released in 2020 for the exA-Arcadia system, Dodonpachi Saidaioujou Exa Label is the first international release of the game and includes 3 new modes, in addition to a remaster of the original version. exA Label mode includes a dynamic difficulty system based on the players performance, X Arrange mode is a revised version of the arrange mode from the Xbox 360 version incoorperating the same life and bomb meter, and Inbachi allows you to fight Inbachi at max rank and 5 lives. By holding down a specific direction on the joystick or button on the mode select screen, you can modify the presentation of the game, and can even activate the overflow glitch as seen in the original arcade release.

Characters
The game has four fighters to choose from, each piloted by an Element Doll:
Type A: fast with concentrated front fire piloted by Shuri (red) CV: Yukana
Type B: moderate speed with subshots following movement, piloted by Hikari (green) CV: Eri Kitamura
Type C: slow speed and widespread fire piloted by Maria (blue) CV: Mamiko Noto
Type D: a unique fighter exclusive to the Xbox 360 and exA-Arcadia versions piloted by Saya (purple) CV: Aya Hirano

Other Characters:
Operator (Game Operator System) CV: Asami Shimoda
Hibachi/Hina/Inbachi (Boss) CV: Aoi Yuuki
Inbachi is the "evil side" of Hibachi.

Plot
The game is set within an alternate timeline from other Dodonpachi games, with all characters from previous games abandoned. In the past, the Element Doll Electronics Laboratory was designing the ultimate Element Doll to assist the human species, dubbed "Project Haruuara." The first units produced were Extra Z-001 "Hina" and Extra Z-002 "Saya." Though they lived as twin sisters and were taught the importance of closeness with humans, they were trained as enemies in combat. When Hina decided that the ultimate answer to humanity's problems was to eliminate the human person, she went berserk. The project was immediately shut down and both Hina and Saya were deactivated. Prior to the beginning of the game, Hina was mysteriously told to "save everybody" and was reactivated, destroying the laboratory and the chamber in which she was sealed. She disappeared after the incident, with her whereabouts unknown to both Donpachi Corps. and Saya, who was still active when she was discovered as one of the few survivors of Element Dolls.

Hina, now going by the name Hibachi, controls an entire weaponry computer system, governing from deep within the technologically advanced City of Ideal, a paradise where humans live in harmony with nature. Believing that the only way to save humankind is to have them adopt a better form, she begins a war to force all humans to become machines. Hastily, the remaining humans of Earth revive the ancient DonPachi Corps to fight Hibachi's army of mechanized people. The new DonPachi's mission is to destroy Hina/Hibachi and her powerful computer system.

If the requirements are met to face Hibachi at the end, she expresses her realization that humans are the ultimate form with her last words.

If Saya is the player's Element Doll, an ending shows Hina damaged and dying in Saya's arms. She tells her she's sorry for everything she has done and thanks her for coming and stopping her before she does something unforgivable. After she dies, Saya cries and after the end credits, Saya is now wearing Hina's ribbons in memory of her and is happy when the pilot comes to her aid.

Development and release
Three main gameplay modes are featured in the Xbox 360 release: the original arcade version containing the infamous "overflow glitch," the exclusive tweaked version 1.5 created as a response to player feedback, and the somewhat different Xbox 360 mode similar to Cave's usual console-only "arrange modes," featuring remixed music, considerably more voice acting, tweaked mechanics, and a single life/bomb meter in place of the usual spare lives.

At launch, three Xbox 360 editions were released: regular edition, limited edition, and super limited edition. The regular edition included only the game. The limited-edition included the game plus an arranged soundtrack, a steelbook case, and a small art book. The super limited edition included the game plus both the arranged and standard soundtracks, a steelbook case, a full-sized art book, and stickers.

Reception
Famitsu magazine awarded Dodonpachi Saidaioujou a score of 33/40 based on four reviews (9/8/8/8).

References

External links
 

2012 video games
Arcade video games
Cave (company) games
DonPachi
Japan-exclusive video games
Vertically scrolling shooters
Video games developed in Japan
Video games featuring female protagonists
Video games scored by Manabu Namiki
Xbox 360 games